Jeff Ufedo Akoh  (born October 27, 1996) is a Nigerian singer. Jeff rose to prominence after winning the eighth season of Project Fame West Africa, a popular singing reality TV competition which was held in late 2015. He won the competition at the age of 18, making him the youngest winner so far. Shortly after, Jeff was offered a management deal with 960 Music Group and Ultima Productions.

Jeff is currently signed to Temple Music, under the umbrella of Temple Management company. In 2017, he released a 16 track album titled 'Lokoja'. In 2018 he followed up with an E.P titled 'I Do' whose lead single 'I Do' garnered 1 million streams on YouTube

Early life 
Jeff was born and bred in the Nigerian capital, Abuja. He attended Shining Star Nursery and Primary School, Abuja and later, Federal Government Boys College, Garki, Abuja.

In 2010, Jeff and his brother, Fred Akoh contested as a duo on Glo Naija Sings when he was 13 where they finished off in the Top 10. He thereafter went to SAE Institute, Cape Town, South Africa where he graduated as a Sound Engineer before winning Project Fame. Jeff has two siblings, a brother and sister who are both musically adept.

References

Musicians from Abuja
21st-century Nigerian male singers
Living people
Nigerian songwriters
Participants in Nigerian reality television series
1996 births